The Kaniksu National Forest (pronounced "Kuh-NICK-su") is a U.S. National Forest located in northeastern Washington, the Idaho Panhandle, and northwestern Montana. It is one of three forests that are aggregated into the Idaho Panhandle National Forests, along with the Coeur d'Alene National Forest and St. Joe National Forest. About 55.7% is in Idaho, 27.9% in Montana, and 16.4% in Washington.

The name Kaniksu is from a Kalispel Indian word which means "black robe." It was used to refer to the Jesuit missionaries who brought their faith to North Idaho and Eastern Washington.

History
Kaniksu National Forest was established on July 1, 1908, from a portion of Priest River National Forest.  On September 30, 1933, a portion of Pend Oreille National Forest was added, and on July 1, 1954, part of Cabinet National Forest was added.  Kaniksu was administratively combined with Coeur d'Alene and St. Joe National Forests on July 1, 1973.

The forest headquarters are located in Coeur d'Alene, Idaho. There are local ranger district offices located in Bonners Ferry, Priest Lake, and Sandpoint (all in Idaho).

A portion of the Salmo-Priest Wilderness lies within Kaniksu National Forest; however, most of it lies within neighboring Colville National Forest, to the west. Also, a portion (47%) of the Cabinet Mountains Wilderness lies within Kaniksu, with most of it (53%) lying within Kootenai National Forest to its north.

Counties
In descending order of land area
 Boundary County, Idaho
 Sanders County, Montana
 Bonner County, Idaho
 Pend Oreille County, Washington
 Lincoln County, Montana
 Stevens County, Washington
 Kootenai County, Idaho

See also
 List of forests in Montana

References

External links 

US Forest Service - Idaho Panhandle National Forests

National Forests of Idaho
National Forests of Montana
National Forests of Washington (state)
National Forests of the Rocky Mountains
Protected areas established in 1908
Protected areas of Pend Oreille County, Washington
Protected areas of Stevens County, Washington
Protected areas of Boundary County, Idaho
Protected areas of Sanders County, Montana
Protected areas of Lincoln County, Montana
Protected areas of Kootenai County, Idaho
Idaho Panhandle National Forest
1908 establishments in Montana
1908 establishments in Idaho
1908 establishments in Washington (state)